Poplar Grove Plantation is a peanut plantation by the Topsail sound in Scotts Hill near Wilmington in Pender County, North Carolina. It was listed on the National Register of Historic Places listings in North Carolina on July 16, 1979.

History

The plantation was originally owned by the widow of Cornelius Harnett. Later, the property, which once included Figure Eight Island, became the home of the Foy family, an American family of French Huguenot descent, from 1795 until 1971. The original plantation house was destroyed in a fire. The current house, a 12-room Greek Revival-style  mansion, was built in the early 1850s by Joseph Mumford Foy. It was mistakenly referenced as being owned by Nicholas Nixon.

The Plantation is now under the care of Poplar Grove Foundation, Inc. Poplar Grove opened as a museum to the public in 1980.

References

External links
 Poplar Grove - official site

Plantation houses in North Carolina
Houses on the National Register of Historic Places in North Carolina
Museums in Pender County, North Carolina
Historic house museums in North Carolina
Greek Revival houses in North Carolina
Houses completed in 1850
Houses in Pender County, North Carolina
National Register of Historic Places in Pender County, North Carolina
Homes of United States Founding Fathers